Fa'anānā Efeso Collins (born ) is a New Zealand politician. He was a Manukau ward councillor on Auckland Council from 2016 to 2022, when he stood down and unsuccessfully contested the 2022 Auckland mayoral election. He is of Samoan and Tokelauan descent.

Early life and family
Collins was born and raised in the Auckland suburb of Ōtara. He was the youngest of six children to bus driver and Pentecostal Church pastor Tauiliili Sio Collins  and factory worker and cleaner Lotomau Collins. His parents immigrated to New Zealand from Sāmoa in the 1960s. Collins carries the Sāmoan matai title of Fa’anana from the village of Satufia, Satupaitea, Savai'i.

He attended East Tamaki Primary School and Ferguson Intermediate School. He briefly attended Auckland Grammar School before moving to Tangaroa College. He later studied education at the University of Auckland, graduating with a Bachelor of Arts in 1997 followed by a Master of Arts in 1999. His MA dissertation included discussion of 'brown flight' . He has subsequently contributed to four published works and taught at Auckland University. He was elected Auckland University Students' Association president in 1999 and was the first Polynesian in that role. As president he represented students on the Auckland University Council. His subsequent career included positions in the education sector and the public service.

Collins married Fia, a diversity and inclusion specialist, in 2011. The couple share two children.

Auckland Council

Papatoetoe Local Board, 2013–2016

At the 2013 Auckland elections, Collins was elected to the Ōtara-Papatoetoe Local Board and became its chairperson. An original campaign song was created by two former members of a church youth group Collins had previously led.

He contested the Labour party candidate selection for the Manukau East seat before the 2014 general election, but ultimately Jenny Salesa was selected and won the seat.

Auckland Council, 2016–2022
At the 2016 Auckland elections, Collins was elected to the Auckland Council, replacing Arthur Anae, who did not seek re-election. He was sworn in as a councillor for the Manukau ward on 1 November 2016. In 2019 he was re-elected as the highest polling candidate in the Manakau Ward. 

On 27 August 2021, during the COVID-19 pandemic in New Zealand, Collins called for the New Zealand Government to grant an amnesty to people who had overstayed their visas in order to encourage members of the Pasifika community to come forward for COVID-19 tests. The then Health Minister Chris Hipkins had earlier reassured the Pasifika community that the Government would not use any information collected during testing for immigration purposes.

On 25 July 2021, Collins disclosed that he and his family had received a death threat on 19 June in response to his comments criticising TVNZ's Police Ten 7 programme for its negative depiction of the Māori and Pasifika communities. Despite the threats to him and his family, and the 'deep sense of guilt' he felt for exposing his family to the threat, Collins and his wife resolved to continue his involvement in politics and he later said this was the moment he decided to run for the Auckland mayoralty.

2022 Auckland mayoral election
In January 2022 Collins announced he would be running for Mayor of Auckland as an independent candidate in the 2022 election. On 28 February 2022, the Labour Party announced that they would be endorsing Collins as their preferred candidate. On 15 March 2022, the Green Party announced their endorsement of Collins, a first for the party. He also received the endorsement of incumbent mayor Phil Goff. Collins' policies included fare-free public transport as "the first and best way" to address the city’s emissions. 

On 8 October, Collins lost the race to centre-right contender Wayne Brown by a margin of 54,000 votes. While Collins won 54,808 votes, Brown won 144,619 votes. Collins attributed his election defeat to alleged "unconscious bias" among voters and the postal ballot system which disadvantaged lower-income voters.

2023 general election
Following the 2022 Auckland mayoral election, Collins announced that he would retire from local body politics. When asked on election night, he stated he had no intention to run for Parliament at the 2023 New Zealand general election but in November it was reported that he was considering opportunities with the Labour Party and the Green Party. He was reported as a likely candidate for the Green Party in January 2023. In February 2023 Collins announced he was seeking selection as the Green candidate for Panmure-Ōtāhuhu and a place on the party list.

Political views
Collins was historically aligned with the Labour Party, but has veered from the party line on a number of occasions, such as opposing the Regional Fuel Tax on equity grounds, and being a vocal supporter of the Ihumātao protest.

His politics are generally centre-left, but he has held some conservative provisions previously. He says these stemmed from his strict, religious upbringing. He was opposed to the Marriage (Definition of Marriage) Amendment Act 2013, which legalised same-sex marriage in New Zealand, but later apologised for his actions. He supported the Conversion Practices Prohibition Legislation Act 2022. On abortion, Collins said in 2022: "I won't get in the way of women and people who are pregnant making their own, deeply personal decisions. I too am on a journey of understanding and empathy and always open to listening to people's diverse experiences and beliefs."

During the 2020 New Zealand cannabis referendum, Collins opposed the legalisation of cannabis; however he supported its decriminalisation.

References

1970s births
Year of birth missing (living people)
Living people
Auckland Councillors
New Zealand Labour Party politicians
New Zealand people of Samoan descent
New Zealand people of Tokelauan descent
People educated at Tangaroa College
University of Auckland alumni
Politicians from Auckland
Green Party of Aotearoa New Zealand politicians